Fordata is an Austronesian language spoken in the Tanimbar Islands of the Moluccas. It is closely related to Kei, and more distantly to Yamdena, both also spoken in the Tanimbar Islands.

Phonology

Consonants 

 Glottal sounds  only occur intervocalically.
  can often be heard as  among younger speakers.
  can also be heard in free variation with a flap sound .

Vowels 

 Sounds  have lax sounds of [ ]
  can have an allophone of  when before a consonant, or in word-final position.

References

External links
 www.bahasafordata.net

Central Malayo-Polynesian languages
Languages of the Maluku Islands